The Breitlauihorn (3,655 m) is a mountain of the Bernese Alps, located east of Blatten in the canton of Valais. It lies west of the Breithorn (Blatten), on the range between the Lötschental and the Baltschiedertal.

References

External links
 Breitlauihorn on Hikr

Bernese Alps
Mountains of the Alps
Alpine three-thousanders
Mountains of Switzerland
Mountains of Valais